The acronym SMBE may refer to:
Sid Meier's Civilization: Beyond Earth. a video game
Society for Molecular Biology and Evolution. an academic society